Abdulwahab Mohammad Al-Babtain (born 1985) is a politician, who is an elected Member of Parliament of the Kuwait Parliament. As the Kuwaiti General Election 2016 was his first stand for elections, he won the first chair in the third constituency by 3,730 votes.

Al-Babtain contributed in the following parliamentary committees:
 Financial and Economic Affairs Committee
 Public Money Protection Committee

References 

1985 births
Living people
Members of the National Assembly (Kuwait)
Kuwait University alumni